Brown's Tavern is a historic tavern and farm complex located at South Hartford in Washington County, New York. The property includes the 1802 Brown's Tavern, an 1878 horse barn, outhouse, corn crib, well and pump, and store and sheds foundations. The tavern building is a rectangular, -story, five by three bay, high-pitched gable roof building measuring 47 feet wide and 37 feet deep.  The interior features a noted ballroom.  It includes Federal style details, but was renovated about 1878–1880 in a regional eclectic style.

It was listed on the National Register of Historic Places in 2000.

References

Farms on the National Register of Historic Places in New York (state)
Federal architecture in New York (state)
Commercial buildings completed in 1802
Buildings and structures in Washington County, New York
Taverns in New York (state)
National Register of Historic Places in Washington County, New York
Taverns on the National Register of Historic Places in New York (state)